Kosuke Taketomi (武富 孝介, born September 23, 1990) is a Japanese football player for Kyoto Sanga FC.

Club statistics
Updated to 20 July 2022.

Honours
 J. League Division 2 (2) : 2010, 2014

References

External links
Profile at Urawa Red Diamonds
Profile at Kashiwa Reysol

1990 births
Living people
Association football people from Saitama Prefecture
Japanese footballers
J1 League players
J2 League players
Kashiwa Reysol players
Roasso Kumamoto players
Shonan Bellmare players
Urawa Red Diamonds players
Kyoto Sanga FC players
Association football midfielders